"All of the Lights" is a song by American rapper Ye, formerly known as Kanye West, released as the fourth single from his fifth studio album, My Beautiful Dark Twisted Fantasy (2010). It was produced by West and features additional vocals from several other recording artists, including Drake, John Legend, The-Dream, Alicia Keys, Fergie, Elton John, Ryan Leslie, Charlie Wilson, Tony Williams, La Roux, Alvin Fields, Ken Lewis, Kid Cudi and Rihanna, with the latter two being credited on the official music video and the official single, but not on the album version of the song. The song is often played along with its accompanying interlude “All of the Lights (Interlude)”

"All of the Lights" was universally acclaimed by music critics, who complimented its detailed production and dramatically-themed style. The single was an international success, reaching number 18 on the Billboard Hot 100, was the 59th most popular song of 2011, and number two on the Hot R&B/Hip-Hop Songs chart in the United States, being the 12th most popular song on that chart in 2011, while it also attained respectable chartings in several other countries. It won Grammy Awards for Best Rap Song and Best Rap/Sung Collaboration and was nominated for Song of the Year at the 54th Annual Grammy Awards. As of December 2011, the song has sold over 1,561,000 digital units in the US. As of November 2020, it has been certified quintuple platinum by the RIAA.

The song's accompanying music video, directed by Hype Williams, featured strobe-lit images of Rihanna and West, as well as Kid Cudi. It was given a discretionary warning by Epilepsy Action, stating that the video "potentially triggers seizures for people with photosensitive epilepsy". West and Rihanna performed the song at the 2011 NBA All-Star Game, while it was also featured in the promo for the same event.

Background and recording 

"All of the Lights" was written by Kanye West, Jeff Bhasker, Malik Jones, Warren Trotter, Stacy Ferguson and Terius Nash. Its production was helmed by West himself and co-produced by Bhasker. Fourteen artists lent their voices as background vocals to the song: Alicia Keys, John Legend, The-Dream, Drake, Fergie, Kid Cudi, Elton John, Ryan Leslie, Charlie Wilson, Tony Williams, La Roux, Alvin Fields, Ken Lewis, and Rihanna, who also sang the song's hook and is labeled as a featured artist on the single version. West and Rihanna previously collaborated with Jay-Z on "Run This Town" (The Blueprint 3, 2009).

The early working title for "All of The Lights" was previously "Ghetto University" when the production on the song was just beginning. Song writer Malik Yusef revealed that the original demo for the song contained a sample of Muhammad Ali saying "The champ is here"; Yusef attempted to create rhymes around it, but ended up telling the engineer to remove the sample to clear space on the song. After having taken the sample out, Yusef eventually came up with the "all of the lights" part after thinking about his son's first words which were "light";

I thought, light is a beautiful word. There's all kinds of light–there's sunlight, there's flashlight, there's strobe lights, there's night lights, there's streetlights...all of the lights. When I said that, a literal light went off in my brain, I was like [singing] "All of the lights, all of the lights". I had it. I went upstairs and told Rick Ross, "I've got it", he said "you sure?" and I said, "I got it!" Jeff Bhasker was in there and he came down, we recorded it, and it just started after that.

In a 2013 interview with The Breakfast Club, West said that the song took two years to finish, and detailed the creation and process of the song;  
"'All The Lights' is a futurist song that started out as a Jeezy record with horns on it, then we put in another bridge, then Dream wrote the hook, then Rihanna sang it, and by the time you got it, it was to the level of like, the Nike Flyknit or something like that.

During the 2010 MTV Europe Music Awards, on November 10, 2010, Rihanna was interviewed by MTV News' staff. In the interview she explained that, West already played his album to her three months ago and that "All of the Lights" was one of her favorite songs. About it, she further commented, "So when he asked me to come up to the studio at 2 o'clock in the morning, I had to, because I loved it, I knew it was that song." 

In an interview for the same publication, Elly Jackson said of the song's vocal layering, "He got me to layer up all these vocals with other people, and he just basically wanted to use his favorite vocalists from around the world to create this really unique vocal texture on his record, but it's not the kind of thing where you can pick it out". Andrew Dawson, Anthony Kilhoffer, Mike Dean, HI and Noah Goldstein recorded West's vocals at Avex Recording Studios in Honolulu, Hawaii and Electric Lady Studios in New York City. Rihanna's vocals were recorded by Marcos Tovar at the Westlake Recording Studios in West Hollywood, California.

Leaks and release 
Even though not fully leaked, "All of the Lights" was featured for the first time on "Runaway"—a 35-minute film about West's "true labor of love" which was released on October 23, 2010. The song was featured in the film together with other songs from West's then-upcoming fifth studio album My Beautiful Dark Twisted Fantasy (2010), including "Monster", "Power" and "Lost in the World" among others. The song fully leaked on November 4, 2010, online.

West announced through his Twitter account that "All of the Lights" would be the album's fourth single. Following the album's release, the song debuted at number 92 on the Billboard Hot 100. It was sent to Australian contemporary hit and alternative radio stations on December 13, 2010. "All of the Lights" was released as a single in the United States on January 18, 2011. Rihanna was credited as a featured artist for the single when impacting radio.

Composition 

"All of the Lights" is a hip hop song that runs for 4 minutes and 59 seconds. According to the sheet music published by Universal Music Publishing Group at Musicnotes.com, it was composed in the key of B flat minor using common time and a steady groove. The vocal range spans from the low note of Ab3 to the high note of F5.
Instrumentation is provided by drums, bass, piano and horns. The piano is played by Elton John, who also together with thirteen other vocalists provides the background vocals. American singers Fergie and Alicia Keys, sing the break-downs and ad-libs, respectively. Alex Deney from NME called the song a "sleb-studded centrepiece".

Reception 
"All of the Lights" received universal critical acclaim. AllMusic's Andy Kellman stated "At once, the song features one of the year’s most rugged beats while supplying enough opulent detail to make Late Registration collaborator Jon Brion's head spin". Alex Denney of NME called it "the sleb-studded centrepiece", commenting that "In anyone else’s hands it’d be an A-list circle-jerk of horrid proportions, but through Kanye’s bar-raising vision it becomes a truly wondrous thing". Zach Baron of The Village Voice found the song's lyrics relevant to the "year of economic suffering", writing that "West interrupted his own wealthy anomie to pen 'All of the Lights,' an incongruously star-stuffed song about a disoriented parolee trying to beat a restraining order and see his daughter, working out a brief reunion with her estranged mother: 'Public visitation, we met at Borders'". Chicago Sun-Times writer Thomas Conner viewed that "as crowded as 'All of the Lights' is [,] it maintains an almost operatic drama, telling a tale of adultery and its aftermath that winds up being quite moving". The Guardians Kitty Empire cited the song as "the album's most magnificent high", writing that it "backs up operatic levels of sound with great drama".

Ann Powers of NPR included "All of the Lights" in her list of the Top 10 Top 40 singles of 2011, commenting "its like an action painting: the artist scatters elements across its canvas to form a whole that's all motion and colorful build." Slant Magazine named it the best single of 2011, describing the song as "perhaps the most acute example of Kanye West’s pitched mania for theatrical expressions of manic-depressive instability, his mixture of self-destruction and self-love", they later listed it second in their list of the best singles of the 2010s in 2019.

Tampa Bay Times named it the second best pop song of the decade, proclaiming "Everything Kanye West has ever believed himself to be came to life in this song: The stadium-sized horns, the chilling Rihanna hook, the snarl of cockiness in his voice, the insane list of uncredited cameos .. It’s the moment King Midas figured out how to use his touch." Elsewhere, Nothing but Hope and Passion listed it 13th on its list of "100 Must Listen Songs of the 2010s". Time Out named it the 13th best song of all-time in 2016.

Music video and remix

The music video for "All of the Lights" was filmed in January 2011 and directed by Hype Williams. It features strobe-lit images of Rihanna and West, Kid Cudi in a red leather suit, and visual references to Gaspar Noé's 2009 film Enter the Void. The video premiered through West's Vevo channel on February 19, 2011. After reports of the video's images causing seizures with epileptic viewers and a public response from British organization Epilepsy Action, an alternate video was released that includes a discretionary warning that the video "potentially trigger[s] seizures for people with photosensitive epilepsy", and removed its opening prologue and neon credits.
In 2015, the video faced controversy when Gaspar Noé commented the similarities between the video and Enter the Void, especially when Hype Williams featured his name in the title and credit sequences over and over again.

An earlier version of the song's remix was leaked in 2010, featuring a verse by Drake. On March 14, 2011, an unfinished version of the remix was leaked to the internet, featuring guest verses from Lil Wayne, Big Sean, and Drake, a different verse from the leak. It did not feature West himself, though he did write a verse for it, according to Big Sean.

Media 
In 2016, the song was used in a Gatorade commercial starring Serena Williams. The song is also featured in the game NBA 2K14 as part of the soundtrack chosen by LeBron James. In 2019, The song was featured in a Peloton TV commercial, entitled; Our Kind of Joy.\

In 2023, Rihanna sang the hook of the song as a part of the Super Bowl LVII halftime show.

Accolades

Credits and personnel 
Credits for "All of the Lights" adapted from liner notes.

 Produced by Kanye West
 Co-produced by Jeff Bhasker
 Recorded by Andrew Dawson, Anthony Kilhoffer, and Mike Dean
 Mixed by Anthony Kilhoffer
 Assistant engineers: Christian Mochizuki, Pete Bischoff and Phil Joly
 Keyboards: Jeff Bhasker and Mike Dean
 Piano: Elton John
 Brass and woodwinds: Danny Flam, Tony Gorruso, and Ken Lewis
 Horn arrangements: Ken Lewis
 Engineered by Brent Kolatalo
 Orchestral arranger and conductor: Rosie Danvers

 Trumpets: Mike Lovatt, Simon Finch, Andy Gathercole
 French horns: Tim Anderson, Tom Rumsby, Richard Ashton
 Trombone: Mark Frost, Philip Judge
 Flute: Chloe Vincent
 Violins: Kotono Sato, Jenny Sacha
 Viola: Rachel Robson
 Cello: Rosie Danvers, Chris "Hitchcock" Chorney
 Cello arrangement: Mike Dean
 Additional vocals: Rihanna, Kid Cudi, Tony Williams, The-Dream, Charlie Wilson, John Legend, Elly Jackson, Alicia Keys, Elton John, Fergie, Ryan Leslie, Drake, Alvin Fields, and Ken Lewis

Charts

Weekly charts

Year-end charts

Certifications

Release history

References 

2010 songs
2011 singles
Def Jam Recordings singles
Grammy Award for Best Rap/Sung Collaboration
Kanye West songs
Music video controversies
Music videos directed by Hype Williams
Rihanna songs
Roc-A-Fella Records singles
Song recordings produced by Jeff Bhasker
Song recordings produced by Kanye West
Songs about domestic violence
Songs written by Jeff Bhasker
Songs written by Kanye West